Ortonville is a city in Big Stone County in the U.S. state of Minnesota at the southern tip of Big Stone Lake, along the border with South Dakota.  The population was 2,021 at the 2020 census.  It is the county seat of Big Stone County. Big Stone Lake State Park is nearby.

History
Ortonville was platted in 1872 by Cornelius Knute Orton, and named for him. Ortonville was incorporated as a city in 1881. The Big Stone County Courthouse was built in 1902.

Geography

U.S. Highways 12 and 75 bypass the city and a state highway, Minnesota State Highway 7 are three of the main routes in the city.

Demographics

2010 census
As of the census of 2010, there were 1,916 people, 884 households, and 509 families living in the city. The racial makeup of the city was 97.0% White, 0.3% African American, 0.6% Native American, 0.1% Asian, 0.7% from other races, and 1.3% from two or more races. Hispanic or Latino of any race were 1.0% of the population.

There were 884 households, of which 22.5% had children under the age of 18 living with them, 45.5% were married couples living together, 8.7% had a female householder with no husband present, 3.4% had a male householder with no wife present, and 42.4% were non-families. 38.6% of all households were made up of individuals, and 21.2% had someone living alone who was 65 years of age or older. The average household size was 2.07 and the average family size was 2.71.

The median age in the city was 49.8 years. 19.7% of residents were under the age of 18; 6.2% were between the ages of 18 and 24; 18.5% were from 25 to 44; 26.7% were from 45 to 64; and 28.8% were 65 years of age or older. The gender makeup of the city was 46.5% male and 53.5% female.

2000 census
As of the census of 2000, there were 2,158 people, 923 households, and 594 families living in the city. The racial makeup of the city was 97.68% White, 0.42% African American, 0.88% Native American, 0.09% Asian, 0.28% from other races, and 0.65% from two or more races. Hispanic or Latino of any race were 0.56% of the population.

There were 923 households, out of which 28.1% had children under the age of 18 living with them, 54.0% were married couples living together, 8.0% had a female householder with no husband present, and 35.6% were non-families. 33.6% of all households were made up of individuals, and 20.4% had someone living alone who was 65 years of age or older.  The average household size was 2.25 and the average family size was 2.88.

In the city, the population was spread out, with 23.9% under the age of 18, 5.1% from 18 to 24, 20.2% from 25 to 44, 24.6% from 45 to 64, and 26.1% who were 65 years of age or older.  The median age was 45 years. For every 100 females, there were 84.6 males.  For every 100 females age 18 and over, there were 79.8 males.

The median income for a household in the city was $30,614, and the median income for a family was $39,375. Males had a median income of $30,590 versus $20,179 for females. The per capita income for the city was $17,132.  About 7.2% of families and 9.2% of the population were below the poverty line, including 9.5% of those under age 18 and 10.1% of those age 65 or over.

Politics

Education
Public schools in independent district 2903 (Ortonville Public School) include Ortonville Secondary School and James Knoll Elementary School. The schools are housed in one building, making the public education in Ortonville K-12. The athletic teams in Ortonville are called the Trojans, and the school's colors are orange and black. There are no private schools in this district.

The Ortonville Public Library is a part of the Pioneerland Library System.

There is no University in Ortonville, but high school students are able to take college level courses through the public high school via the College in the Schools program.

Media

Newspaper
The Ortonville Independent is a weekly newspaper published in Ortonville on Tuesday.  It has a circulation of 1911 in 2019 and is owned by the Kaercher Group.

AM radio

FM radio

Notable people
 Samuel Russell Barr, Minnesota state legislator
 Agnes Gardner Eyre, pianist and composer
 Sarah Hart (née Gengler), a perpetrator of the Hart family murders; 1997 Ortonville High School graduate (from neighboring Big Stone City, SD). 
 Dan Jurgens, comic book writer and artist, known for his work on the Superman comic books
 Edwin Joseph Martinson, member of the Minnesota House of Representatives
 Liz Olson, member of the Minnesota House of Representatives
 Mike Hunt (American football), former professional American football player.

References

External links

Official website

Cities in Big Stone County, Minnesota
Cities in Minnesota
County seats in Minnesota